The Noble M14 was a prototype vehicle created by Noble Automotive that debuted at the 2004 British Motor Show.

Noble expected it to compete with cars like the new (at the time) Porsche 911 Turbo and Ferrari F430. It was expected to cost £75,000.

Following the debut of the vehicle Lee Noble the creator of the car decided that it was insufficiently advanced over the current range of Noble cars to justify its price tag. Noble transferred development to a new car the Noble M15, a pre-production prototype of which was presented in 2007 (and shown on TV's Top Gear) but never launched. Noble is now believed to be working on two updated replacements - the M600 and the M15C (see Autocar magazine, 20 October 2007).

The M14 has appeared in a handful of video games including Test Drive Unlimited, Burnout Revenge and Project Gotham Racing 3.

References 

M14
Rear mid-engine, rear-wheel-drive vehicles